John F. "Andy" Anders is an American politician, who served as a member of the Louisiana House of Representatives for the 21st district from 2006 to 2020.

Education 
Anders earned a Bachelor of Science degree in agribusiness from the Louisiana Polytechnic Institute in 1979.

Career 
In 2006, Anders was elected for the 21st district of the Louisiana House of Representatives. He succeeded Bryant Hammett. In 2020, Anders was succeeded by C. Travis Johnson. During his tenure in the House, Anders served as chair and vice chair of the Agriculture, Forestry, Aquaculture and Rural Development Committee.

References 

Living people
Place of birth missing (living people)
Year of birth missing (living people)
Democratic Party members of the Louisiana House of Representatives
21st-century American politicians
Louisiana Tech University alumni